Abderahmane Soussi (born 30 January 2003) is a professional footballer player who plays for Antwerp. Born in Belgium, he is a youth international for Morocco.

Club career
On 3 June 2021, he signed a three-year professional contract with Antwerp.

He made his Belgian First Division A debut for Antwerp on 25 July 2021 in a game against Mechelen.

International career
Born in Belgium, Soussi is of Moroccan descent. He was called up to a pair of friendlies with the Morocco U20s against Spain U20s in April 2022.

References

External links
 

2003 births
Living people
Moroccan footballers
Morocco youth international footballers
Belgian footballers
Belgian sportspeople of Moroccan descent
Association football midfielders
RWDM47 players
Royale Union Saint-Gilloise players
Royal Antwerp F.C. players
Challenger Pro League players
Belgian Pro League players